Ishq Aaj Kal is an Indian web series featured on ZEE5. The show is produced by Dheeraj Kumar, Zuby Kochhar, Sunil Gupta and directed by Nitesh Singh. It stars Angad Hasija, Ankitta Sharma, and Paras Kalnawat in lead roles. This show is a spin-off version of Ishq Subhan Allah.

The story revolves around Alia Jaffri whose dark past continues to ruin her present life and impacts her relationships. Right after the success of Season 1, Ishq Aaj Kal was renewed at Zee5 for second, third and fourth seasons.

Premise 
The story focuses around 24-year-old Alia Jaffri who is on a mission to find her father and discover the truth about her mother's murder.

Synopsis 
Alia Jaffri is interning at a hotel where her team is led by Arshad Ali Khan. Within the team, Faraz Sheikh seems to show an interest in Alia but she dislikes him.

However, Alia's dark past brings her, Faraz and Arshad to a crossroads.

Cast 
 Angad Hasija as Arshad Ali Khan
 Ankitta Sharma as Alia Jaffri
 Paras Kalnawat as Faraz Sheikh
 Puneett Chouksey as Ejaz Ali Khan
 Roshmi Banik as Munmun Sengupta
 Kavita Ghai as Naaz Khan
 Rushil Bangia was added to the cast for Season 3

Episodes

Season 1

Season 2

Season 3

Season 4

References

External links

ZEE5 original programming
Indian television spin-offs
2019 Indian television series debuts